Pinhal da Serra is a municipality in the state of Rio Grande do Sul in the Southern Region of Brazil. It was raised to municipality status in 1996, the area being taken out of the municipality of Esmeralda.

See also
List of municipalities in Rio Grande do Sul

References

Municipalities in Rio Grande do Sul